The 2000 Asian Super Cup was the 6th Asian Super Cup, a football match played between the winners of the previous season's Asian Club Championship and Asian Cup Winners Cup competitions. The 2000 competition was contested by Al Hilal of Saudi Arabia, who won the 1999-2000 Asian Club Championship, and Shimizu S-Pulse of Japan, the winners of the 1999–2000 Asian Cup Winners' Cup.

Route to the Super Cup

Al-Hilal 

1Al-Hilal goals always recorded first.

Shimizu S-Pulse 

1Shimizu S-Pulse goals always recorded first.

Game summary 

|}

First leg

Second leg

References 
 Asian Super Cup 2000

Asian Super Cup
Super
2000
2000
Asia
Al Hilal SFC matches
Shimizu S-Pulse matches